Alfred S. Ruth (December 18, 1865 – June 30, 1915) was an American politician in the state of Washington. He served in the Washington State Senate. From 1909 to 1911, he was president pro tempore of the senate.

References

1865 births
1915 deaths
Republican Party Washington (state) state senators
19th-century American politicians
People from Linneus, Maine